Coxim is a municipality located in the Brazilian state of Mato Grosso do Sul. Its population was 33,459 (2020) and its area is 6,412 km². It was founded in 1729.

It is located at the confluence of the Coxim and Taquari rivers. Its economy is based on tourism, fishing and animal husbandry.

References

External links 
Pantanal Escapes - Travel Guide and tourist information for Coxim and Rio Verde

Municipalities in Mato Grosso do Sul